The 1977 Montreal Expos season was the ninth season in the history of the franchise. The team finished fifth in the National League East with a record of 75–87, 26 games behind the Philadelphia Phillies. This was the Expos' first year in Olympic Stadium, after playing their first eight seasons at Jarry Park.

Offseason
 November 6, 1976: Pat Scanlon, Steve Dunning, and Tony Scott were traded to the St. Louis Cardinals for Bill Greif, Ángel Torres and Sam Mejías.
 December 6, 1976: Roger Freed was drafted from the Expos by the St. Louis Cardinals in the 1976 rule 5 draft.
 December 10, 1976: Andre Thornton was traded to the Cleveland Indians for Jackie Brown.
 December 16, 1976: Woodie Fryman and Dale Murray were traded to the Cincinnati Reds for Tony Pérez and Will McEnaney.
 March 15, 1977: Rodney Scott was traded to the Texas Rangers for Jeff Terpko.

Spring training
The Expos held spring training at City Island Ball Park in Daytona Beach, Florida, their fifth season there.

Regular season
 April 15: The Expos set an attendance record for a regular season game as 57,592 fans attend the first game at Olympic Stadium. They were defeated 7 to 2 by the eventual National League East Champion Philadelphia Phillies. Ellis Valentine of the Expos homered in the third inning for the first home run at the Expos' new home.
 April 20: Catcher Gary Carter hit three home runs in one game.

Opening Day starters
Gary Carter
Dave Cash
Warren Cromartie
Andre Dawson
Tim Foli
Larry Parrish
Tony Pérez
Don Stanhouse
Ellis Valentine

Season standings

Record vs. opponents

Notable transactions
 April 6: Don Carrithers was purchased by the Minnesota Twins.
 April 10: Tom Walker was signed as a free agent.
 June 7: 1977 Major League Baseball Draft
Bill Gullickson was selected in the 1st round (2nd pick).
Scott Sanderson was selected in the 3rd round.
Tim Raines was selected in the 5th round.
 June 22: Joe Pettini was signed as an amateur free agent.
 July 13: Tom Walker was purchased by the California Angels.

Roster

Player stats

Batting

Starters by position
Note: Pos = Position; G = Games played; AB = At bats; H = Hits; Avg. = Batting average; HR = Home runs; RBI = Runs batted in

Other batters
Note: G = Games played; AB = At bats; H = Hits; Avg. = Batting average; HR = Home runs; RBI = Runs batted in

Pitching

Starting pitchers
Note: G = Games pitched; IP = Innings pitched; W = Wins; L = Losses; ERA = Earned run average; SO = Strikeouts

Other pitchers
Note: G = Games pitched; IP = Innings pitched; W = Wins; L = Losses; ERA = Earned run average; SO = Strikeouts

Relief pitchers
Note: G = Games pitched; W = Wins; L = Losses; SV = Saves; ERA = Earned run average; SO = Strikeouts

Award winners

1977 Major League Baseball All-Star Game
 Ellis Valentine, reserve

Farm system

LEAGUE CHAMPIONS: Denver

Notes

References

External links
 1977 Montreal Expos team page at Baseball Reference
 1977 Montreal Expos team page at www.baseball-almanac.com

Montreal Expos seasons
Montreal Expos season
1970s in Montreal
1977 in Quebec